Maungatua, known also as  Maukaatua is a prominent ridge in the Taieri Plains in Otago, New Zealand.

It rises 895 metres above the floodplain of the Taieri River, directly to the west of Dunedin's airport at Momona. It can be clearly seen from much of Dunedin's urban area, 35 kilometres to the east, and from as far south as the outskirts of Balclutha, 65 kilometres to the southwest. Lake Mahinerangi is located on the western side of Maungatua.

The name Maungatua comes from the Māori words Maunga-atua, meaning "Hill of the spirits".

Ecology of Maungatua 
Maungatua features a diverse range of plant species. The summit features tussock grassland and cushion bogs, whilst the sub-alpine zone includes shrubland and tussock grasslands. Carnivorous insect eating plants called sundews are found within swamps at the summit.  Silver beech dominates the montane slopes, particularly on the southern face. This transitions to lowland podocarp forest which extends into the Waipori Gorge. This includes a mixture of broadleaf and kānuka forest.  In addition, the only naturally-occurring kāmahi in the Dunedin area are found in the southern Maungatua in Mill Creek. Glowworms may also be found living in mānuka trees at the base of Maungatua.

References 

Mountains of Otago